Magnhild Lien is a Norwegian mathematician specializing in knot theory. She is a professor emeritus of mathematics at California State University, Northridge, and the former executive director of the Association for Women in Mathematics.

Education and career
Lien was born in Arendal, a town on the southern Norwegian island of Tromøya, where she grew up as the youngest of six children and the only girl in her family.
She earned a bachelor's degree from McGill University in 1979, and completed her Ph.D. in 1984 from the University of Iowa. Her dissertation, Construction of High Dimensional Knot Groups from Classical Knot Groups, was supervised by Jonathan Kalman Simon.

She joined the faculty at California State University, Northridge in 1987,
and served as department chair of mathematics there from 1998 to 2006.
She was executive director of the Association for Women in Mathematics from 2012 to 2018.

Contributions
As well as publishing her own mathematical research on knot theory, Lien has written about women in mathematics in collaboration with her husband, sociologist Harvey Rich.

Recognition
Lien was included in the 2019 class of fellows of the Association for Women in Mathematics "for extraordinary leadership and service devoted to advancing and supporting women in the mathematical sciences, as AWM executive director and, for a quarter century, as initiator, director, and fundraiser of programs for women".

References

Year of birth missing (living people)
Living people
People from Arendal
Norwegian mathematicians
20th-century American mathematicians
American women mathematicians
Norwegian women mathematicians
Topologists
McGill University alumni
University of Iowa alumni
California State University, Northridge faculty
Fellows of the Association for Women in Mathematics
20th-century women mathematicians
20th-century American women
20th-century Norwegian women
21st-century American women